Anna Turner (December 8, 1942 – August 27, 1996) was an American producer and administrator. Turner is best known as the original partner of Stephen Hill for launching the space music radio show Hearts of Space: she was its original radio co-producer (1973–1987) and early co-host (1974–1986), as well as co-founder and record co-producer (1984–1990s) of the associated label Hearts of Space Records.

Biography

NCET
In the early 1970s, Turner worked as general administrative assistant and "Information Director and Tape Librarian" at the [NCET] (National Center for Experiments in Television, a KQED-TV project of the San Francisco visual arts, funded by National Endowment for the Arts and the Rockefeller Foundation), also "coordinating the authorship and publication of written materials concerning NCET."

Turner was described as "sweet, beautiful, skillful, intelligent, insightful, and in our work situations, astoundingly dependable.  She was an artistic sounding-board for me, and we worked very closely together on most of my more demanding projects – including being my primary support person throughout the production of the Videola exhibit", as eulogized by ex-boyfriend and NCET's then-resident video artist Don Hallock, who also noted her as "a central element of NCET's success."

Hearts of Space

In 1973, Turner was the original radio co-producer of Stephen Hill's weekly radio show Hearts of Space (HOS). Turner also became the show's co-host from 1974 to 1986, originally under the on-air pseudonym of "Annamystic" (sometimes rendered "Anna Mystic"). In 1980, Hill and Turner "began to lay the groundwork for national syndication" and in January 1983 the show was syndicated in the U.S. on National Public Radio; as Hill memorialized, "More than anyone else, she was responsible for moving the program into national distribution, for Anna was a person with vision, always moving towards the next frontier."

In mid-1986, Turner started gradually disengaging from the show, with some of her producing duties picked up by "then new, now long running guest producer Ellen Holmes" of Adagio Recordings. According to a fan timeline of the show, Turner's last show dual-narrated with Hill was program 109 "Departure" (October 1986) and her last show as narrator was program 118 "Dona Nobis Pacem" (December 1986). Her last co-production credit was for program 121 "Take It to Heart"; Turner co-produced 114 of the syndicated shows, being most programs from #1 (January 1983) to #121 (February 1987).

HOS Records

In 1980, Hill and Turner decided to expand the radio program and started a mail order business to sell the albums played on the show; together they wrote a 100-page annotated catalog called The Hearts of Space Guide to Cosmic, Transcendent and Innerspace Music (1981). They also spent time helping some artists produce records, such as Constance Demby's 1982 Sacred Space Music, whose liner notes credited Hill and expressed "to Anna Turner of Music for the Hearts of Space, the deepest appreciation and gratitude for her guidance – both artistic and musical – and for the depth of her wisdom, generosity and love."

In 1984, Hill and Turner co-founded the show's record label, Hearts of Space Records (later sold to Valley Entertainment in 2001). Turner was a record co-producer for some of its about 150 releases, such as Constance Demby's best-selling Novus Magnificat (1986). She also co-produced the New Age compilation Polar Shift: A Benefit for Antarctica (1991, including Demby, Yanni, and Vangelis), released by Picture Music.

Personal life
Anna Turner was born in 1942. After her Hearts of Space years, Turner lived up to her old radio pseudonym "Annamystic" when according to her friend Don Hallock, she "embarked on an intense journey of spiritual inquiry. She spent considerable time studying with New Age inspirational speaker Jach Pursel, who allegedly channeled a "multidimensional entity" named Lazaris.

According to Hill, Anna Turner died of "a fast moving form of cancer" on August 27, 1996, "in her early 50s." The next month, Hearts of Space broadcast a memorial to her with a rerun of program 91 re-titled the "Anna Turner Tribute" and introduced by Stephen Hill, who said that "this program captures a big part of Anna Turner's being: full of light, beauty, and vision, always reaching for the next frontier."

Notes

References
 Bonk, Jamie (2005). , Conversations with Jamie: Artist-To-Artist Series, July 2005, New Age Reporter at NewAgeReporter.com via Archive.org
 Hallock, Don. "NCET Anna Turner" at NCET
 Hallock, Don. "NCET Don Hallock - Page 2" at NCET
 Hill, Stephen (1996). "PGM 091: Anna Turner Tribute (Crystal Light)", re-broadcast on Hearts of Space as "PGM 091R" on September 13, 1996 with a new introduction by Hill, audio and transcript at HOS.com
 HOS. "Hearts of Space - Bios" at HOS.com
 HOS. "Hearts of Space - Company" at HOS.com
 HOS. "Hearts of Space - Stephen Hill" at HOS.com
 NCET. "NCET Cast List"

Further reading
 Birosik, Patti Jean, ed. (1989). "Space Music" by Anna Turner, in The New Age Music Guide, London: Collier MacMillan, p. 134
 Melton, J. Gordon, ed. (1990). New Age Encyclopedia by J. Gordon Melton, Jerome Clark, & Aidan A. Kelly, Detroit: Gale Research, p. 211 
 Robertson, Don (2005). "The Twentieth Century, Part Six: New Age Music" in Music through the Centuries, Rising World Entertainment, October 2005, released at DoveSong.com

External links
 Anna appeared as lily in Edgar Wallaces 1959 film 
"URGE TO KILL"

1942 births
1996 deaths
American radio producers
American radio personalities
NPR personalities
Record producers from California
20th-century American businesspeople
Women radio producers